Buxton is a spa town in the High Peak district of Derbyshire, England. The town contains 93 listed buildings that are recorded in the National Heritage List for England. Of these, one is listed at Grade I, the highest of the three grades, seven are at Grade II*, the middle grade, and the others are at Grade II, the lowest grade. That the town was a source of natural water springs has been known at least since Roman times, and during the medieval period, St Ann's Well was a shrine and a place of pilgrimage. Buxton developed into a spa town during the 18th and 19th centuries, largely under the influence of the Dukes of Devonshire. The water was considered to have curative powers, and this led to the building of bath houses and later a hospital. Later, leisure facilities grew, and were served by the Pavilion Gardens, and the building of a conservatory, a theatre, a concert hall, and an opera house.

A number of the listed buildings are associated with these developments. Most of the other listed buildings are houses and associated structures, in particular those forming The Crescent, which is listed at Grade I. The other listed buildings include hotels and public houses, churches and items in churchyards, a market cross, shops and offices, two drinking fountains, a screen wall at the railway station, a postbox, the town hall, a railway viaduct, and three war memorials.


Key

Buildings

See also

 Lost buildings of Buxton
 Pubs and inns in Buxton

References

Citations

Sources

 

Lists of listed buildings in Derbyshire